Lord of Dreams can mean:

 Dream (character), in Neil Gaiman's The Sandman fictional universe
 Nightmare (Marvel Comics), in the Marvel Comics fictional universe

See also 
 Lord of Illusions